Brenton Bersin (born May 9, 1990) is a former American football wide receiver. He was signed by the Carolina Panthers as an undrafted free agent in 2012. He played college football at Wofford.

Early life 
Bersin attended Charlotte Latin School. He graduated in 2008.

College career
Bersin played college football at Wofford College from 2008 to 2011. He started 33 of 46 games in his career, recording 77 receptions for 1,567 yards and 15 touchdowns. His junior year was his most successful year at Wofford, catching a team high 32 passes for 705 yards, with the yardage mark good enough for third in school history. He had nine touchdown catches, which tied Jerry Richardson for the school's single-season record. His senior year marked his only individual award collected at Wofford, when he won the Week 6 Special Teams Player of the Week for the Southern Conference after returning a punt 76 yards for a touchdown against The Citadel Bulldogs.

Professional career 
Bersin was signed by the Carolina Panthers after going undrafted in the 2012 NFL Draft. Bersin was released by the Panthers during the first round of cuts in 2012.  In 2013, Bersin signed with the Arizona Rattlers of the Arena Football League, playing in three games before re-signing with the Panthers in the spring.  Once again, Bersin was released during training camp, this time during the final round of cuts.  He spent all of the 2013 season on the Panthers practice squad before finally making the 53-man roster in 2014 after the team had lost all active receivers from the previous year. His first NFL catch came against the Lions on September 14, 2014 when he caught a third down pass from Cam Newton for eight yards and a first down. His first touchdown came on October 20, 2014 against the Green Bay Packers on a one-yard pass from Derek Anderson.

Bersin was released by the Panthers during final roster cuts on September 5, 2015, and was then signed to the teams' practice squad.  He was once again signed to the active roster as a free agent from the practice squad on September 25, 2015. Bersin had a career-high 54 yards receiving in a week four matchup against the Tampa Bay Buccaneers, as well as a career long 30-yard reception. 

On February 7, 2016, Bersin's Panthers played in Super Bowl 50. He was inactive for the game, which saw the Panthers fall to the Denver Broncos by a score of 24–10.

Bersin was released by the Panthers on October 1, 2016 and re-signed two days later. Bersin caught two passes in the 2016 season.

On March 7, 2017, Bersin signed a one-year contract extension with the Panthers. He was placed on injured reserve on September 2, 2017. He was released on September 11, 2017. He was re-signed by the Panthers on November 1, 2017.

References

External links
Carolina Panthers bio
Wofford Terriers bio

1990 births
Carolina Panthers players
Living people
Players of American football from Charlotte, North Carolina
American football wide receivers
Wofford Terriers football players
Arizona Rattlers players